KYST (920 kHz) is a commercial AM radio station branded as "La Nueve Veinte."  It airs a Spanish-language talk, news and sports radio format.  KYST is licensed to Texas City, Texas, and serves Greater Houston.  The station is owned by Hispanic Broadcasting, Inc.

The studios and offices are on Southwest Freeway in Houston.  The transmitter is on 29th Street North in Texas City.

History
The station went on the air in November 1948 as 92 KTLW.  In the 1960s and 1970s, it aired a Top 40 format. In 1980, the call letters were changed to KYST. In 1982, while officially known as KYST, it billed itself as "Beatle Radio Number 9 KBTL" and had a format of all Beatles music.
From the mid-1980s into the early 1990s it ran a Tejano format, as AM 920 KYST. It currently airs a Spanish Full Service format and is the longest continuously owned and operated radio station in the market.

References

External links
Texas State Government list of Houston-area radio stations

Hispanic and Latino American culture in Houston
YST
News and talk radio stations in the United States
YST
Radio stations established in 1947
1947 establishments in Texas